"When Will I See You Smile Again?" is a song performed by American contemporary R&B group Bell Biv DeVoe, issued as the fourth single from the group's debut studio album Poison. The song peaked at #63 on the Billboard Hot 100 in 1991, while reaching number three on the American R&B charts.

Music video

The official music video for the song was directed by Lionel C. Martin.

Chart positions

References

External links
 
 

1989 songs
1991 singles
Bell Biv DeVoe songs
MCA Records singles
Music videos directed by Lionel C. Martin
Contemporary R&B ballads